The International Mycological Association (IMA) is a professional organization that promotes mycology, the study of fungi. It was founded in 1971 during the first International Mycological Congress, which was held in Exeter (UK).

The IMA publishes the open access scientific journal IMA Fungus.

It represents the interests of over 30,000 mycologists worldwide.

Awards
The society makes several awards for contributions to mycology:
 De Bary Medal to long-established mycologists based on their career achievement
 Ainsworth Medal for services to the world of mycology
 Young Mycologists awards through a series of medals recognising the achievements of young mycologists working in different regions around the world: Ethel Mary Doidge Medal (Africa); Keisuke Tubaki Medal (Asia); Carlos Luis Spegazzini Medal (Latin America); Elias Magnus Fries Medal (Europe); Arthur Henry Reginald Buller Medal (North America); Daniel McAlpine Medal (Australasia)

References

External links

Mycology organizations
International scientific organizations
Organizations established in 1971